Petersen Rock Garden, formerly Petersen's Rock Garden and also known as the Petersen Rock Gardens, is a rock garden and museum on , located between the cities of Bend and Redmond in Deschutes County, Oregon, United States. Rasmus Petersen, a Danish immigrant who settled in Central Oregon in the early 1900s, began constructing the garden in 1935 using rocks he found within an  radius of his family home. Petersen constructed detailed miniature castles, churches and other small buildings and monuments from a variety of rock types. He incorporated other design elements such as bridges, water features, and natural landscaping. Petersen worked on the garden until his death in 1952; the garden has remained in his family's care since then. The garden, considered a roadside attraction with novelty architecture, includes roaming peafowl and a museum with a gift shop that sells rocks.

In 2011, Petersen Rock Garden was named one of Oregon's Most Endangered Places by the Historic Preservation League of Oregon (now known as Restore Oregon). In 2012, accidental damage to one of the stone bridges by a contractor catalyzed an effort to document the garden using laser scanning and other technologies. The garden was closed temporarily in 2013 to undergo repair and review for listing on the National Register of Historic Places. Petersen has been praised for his creative work, and the garden has received a positive reception for its uniqueness and local significance. Listing on the National Register was achieved on October 30, 2013. The garden closed indefinitely in 2016 because of high repair costs. In June 2022, Petersen was listed for sale.

Description
It contains dozens of "fanciful" and "intricately detailed" miniature buildings, including castles, churches and cottages, constructed from agate, jasper, lava, malachite, obsidian, petrified wood and thundereggs.

The  grounds also contain roaming peafowl and a small museum with a gift shop that sells rocks, including crystals, fossils and semiprecious gemstones. The museum features a fluorescent room with miniature castles constructed from manganese, tungsten, uranium and zinc that glow in the dark. Petersen Rock Garden is open every day from 9 a.m. until closing time, which varies depending on the season. Admission was $4.50 for adults, at self-pay stations, as of 2009. It is not a member of the Oregon Museums Association. The price had increased to $6 by 2016.

History

Rasmus Petersen, a Danish immigrant who settled in Central Oregon in the early 1900s at age 17, began constructing the rock garden on the grounds of his family home in 1935. The "eccentric" farmer used rocks that he found within an  radius. He attempted to evoke his native country with his designs, but also created monuments to the United States, including a concrete American flag and a  replica of the Statue of Liberty. Petersen incorporated other design elements such as bridges, water features (lagoons, lily ponds and streams) and natural landscaping. He worked on the garden until his death in 1952; the garden has remained in his family's care since then. A bronze plaque in front of the Statue of Liberty replica reads: "Enjoy yourself: it's later than you think." Petersen's Rock Garden became known as Petersen Rock Garden in the mid-1950s. At its height, supported by traffic from the Old Bend-Redmond Highway, the garden drew approximately 150,000 visitors a year.

The garden is managed and owned by Petersen's grand-stepdaughter, Susan Caward, and her family, who has struggled to maintain the lawns and dozens of sculptures. In 2011, the garden was named one of Oregon's Most Endangered Places by the Historic Preservation League of Oregon (now known as Restore Oregon). The "Endangered Places" program raises awareness of the state's "historic treasures in need of the advocacy and support to save them from demise". According to the League, the deteriorating garden needed "maintenance, a business plan and a publicity campaign to ensure stewardship and funds are available to overcome vandalism, theft, and condition issues". In 2012, a contractor accidentally damaged one of the stone bridges, catalyzing an effort to document the garden using laser scanning and other technologies. The Portland-based company i-Ten measured and archived the site's geospatial data, allowing potential future rebuilding to match the original construction.

The garden was closed from February 1 through May 24, 2013 to undergo repair and review for listing on the National Register of Historic Places. The family and ten volunteers worked for nearly six months to restore the grounds. The cleanup process included the removal of dead vegetation and junk from outbuildings, and an estate sale that included items from before Petersen's death. On May 25, 2013, Petersen Rock Garden hosted its "grand reopening". The opening was attended by members of the Confederated Tribes of Warm Springs, who sang and blessed the garden. Caward has considered opening a cafe on the grounds, and turning the family home into a bed and breakfast. Owen Evans, a friend of the family who has assisted with the restoration, has also envisioned a museum reorganization, a small amphitheater to host outdoor concerts and other events, and additional rock sculptures mimicking Petersen's style.

Petersen Rock Garden was added to the National Register of Historic Places on October 30, 2013. The garden closed indefinitely in September 2016. Caward said closing was necessary because of repair costs and the cancellation of the garden's insurance due to safety concerns. The dilapidated garden was still accessible but remained in a state of disrepair, as of October 2017.

Reception

According to the Northwest Digital Archives, photographer Myron Symons typed the following description of the garden during the 1940s within a photo album that is now part of University of Washington Libraries, Special Collections:

Petersen Rock Garden has attracted visitors from around the world. In 2009, The Oregonian Terry Richard wrote that Petersen's work is "more than a half-century old, but it's still amazing". The Historic Preservation League of Oregon considers the garden a "real gem" for its local significance and its "unique expression of mid-century roadside architecture". Moon Publications described it as a "full-fledged rock fantasy" and a "rock garden to end all rock gardens", with a "funky" museum. Via, the online magazine for the American Automobile Association's West Coast club, called the garden "folksy" and Petersen "imaginative" for his work.

The garden has inspired at least one other Oregon resident to construct rock sculptures. In 2013, Pennan Brae released a music video for the song "Don't Know Nothing 'Bout Love", which was filmed at Petersen Rock Garden.

See also
 Geology of the Pacific Northwest
 List of museums in Oregon
 National Register of Historic Places listings in Deschutes County, Oregon

References

External links

 Petersen Rock Garden at RoadsideAmerica.com
 Photos by Paul Tice and  i-Ten (2012), including 3D models and laser scans
 Friends of Petersen Rock Gardens, having the largest collection of photographs from inception of the gardens to the present

1930s architecture in the United States
1935 establishments in Oregon
1940s architecture in the United States
1950s architecture in the United States
Gardens in Oregon
Museums in Deschutes County, Oregon
Garden museums
National Register of Historic Places in Deschutes County, Oregon
Novelty buildings in Oregon
Open-air museums in Oregon
Oregon's Most Endangered Places
Roadside attractions in Oregon
Rock gardens
Tourist attractions in Deschutes County, Oregon